The Elks Building in Vancouver, Washington was built in 1911.  It was listed on the National Register of Historic Places in 1983.

It was designed by Portland architect Robert F. Tegan.

The local Elks club was for many years the most prestigious fraternal organization in Vancouver.  Eventually the Rotary Club overtook it.

References

Elks buildings
Buildings and structures completed in 1911
Buildings and structures in Clark County, Washington
Clubhouses on the National Register of Historic Places in Washington (state)
National Register of Historic Places in Clark County, Washington